Luigi Gnocchi (14 January 1933 – 18 October 2014) was an Italian sprinter, that won three gold medals in one single edition of Mediterranean Games. He was born in Gallarate. He was finalist with the national relay team on 4x100 metres relay at the 1956 Summer Olympics (4th place).

Biography
Gnocchi participated at one edition of the Summer Olympics (1956), he has 11 caps in national team from 1953 to 1956.

National records
 100 metres: 10.4 ( Rome, 29 September 1956)

Achievements

National titles
Gnocchi won the individual national championship five times.
3 wins on 100 metres (1954, 1955, 1956)
2 wins on 200 metres (1955, 1956)

See also
 100 metres winners of Italian Athletics Championships
 200 metres winners of Italian Athletics Championships
 Italy national relay team

References

External links
 
 Luigi Gnocchi's obituary 

1933 births
2014 deaths
Italian male sprinters
Olympic athletes of Italy
Athletes (track and field) at the 1956 Summer Olympics
Mediterranean Games gold medalists for Italy
Athletes (track and field) at the 1955 Mediterranean Games
Mediterranean Games medalists in athletics
Italian Athletics Championships winners